This article lists events that occurred during 1992 in Estonia.

Incumbents

Events
Estonia held a referendum on its constitution.
Heinrich Mark and the government in exile appointed by him cede their credentials to the newly elected Riigikogu.
Lennart Meri was elected President of Estonia.
20 June – The Soviet ruble was replaced with kroon.

Births

Deaths

See also
 1992 in Estonian football
 1992 in Estonian television

References

 
1990s in Estonia
Estonia
Estonia
Years of the 20th century in Estonia